Malcolm Barrett may refer to:

Malcolm Barrett (actor) (born 1980), American actor
Malcolm Barrett (Stargate), a character in the Stargate franchise